The 2002 Brazilian Grand Prix (formally the XXXI Grande Prêmio Marlboro do Brasil) was a Formula One motor race held on 31 March 2002 at the Autódromo José Carlos Pace, São Paulo, Brazil. It was the third round of the 2002 Formula One season and the thirty-first Brazilian Grand Prix. The 71-lap race was won by Ferrari driver Michael Schumacher after starting from the second position. Ralf Schumacher finished second for the Williams team with David Coulthard third in a McLaren.

Juan Pablo Montoya started from pole position alongside Michael Schumacher. Mika Salo scored his last world championship points at this race.

Michael Schumacher's win was his second of the season, his fourth at Interlagos, and the result meant that he extended his lead in the Drivers' Championship to eight points over Ralf Schumacher and ten over Montoya. Ferrari reduced the lead of Williams in the Constructors' Championship to six points with fourteen races of the season remaining.

Background
The Grand Prix was contested by eleven teams, each of two drivers. The teams, also known as constructors, were Ferrari, McLaren, Williams, Sauber, Jordan, BAR, Renault, Jaguar, Arrows, Minardi and Toyota. Tyre suppliers Bridgestone and Michelin brought two new dry compounds for the race.

Going into the race, Ferrari driver Michael Schumacher led the Drivers' Championship with 14 points, ahead of Williams driver Juan Pablo Montoya with 12 points. Montoya's teammate Ralf Schumacher was third on 10 points, ahead of McLaren driver Kimi Räikkönen and Eddie Irvine for Jaguar. In the Constructors' Championship, Williams were leading with 22 points; eight points ahead of Ferrari with 14 points; McLaren were a further 10 points behind in third. Ferrari and Williams had so far dominated the championship, with Ralf Schumacher winning the Malaysian Grand Prix. Championship contender Montoya had gained second-place finishes, with Räikkonen achieving a third-place podium finishes.

Following the Malaysian Grand Prix on 17 March, the teams conducted testing sessions at the Circuit de Catalunya from 19–22 March. Jaguar concentrated on chassis development to decide whether to race their previous chassis, the R2 and concentrate development on the R3 with their test team, when the latter suffered from poor performance. McLaren test driver Alexander Wurz (McLaren) set the fastest time of the first day, while Rubens Barrichello (Ferrari) was fastest on the second and final days of testing, and Michael Schumacher (Ferrari) topped the third day's running.

Ferrari's main 2002 car, the F2002, was introduced that weekend; the team had been using a modified version of their 2001 car, the F2001, for the opening two rounds. Originally due to be introduced at the first race in Australia, problems with its performance had left the team to develop the car, delaying its debut. One chassis of the F2002 was made available to Michael Schumacher with teammate Barrichello using a modified F2001.

Practice
Four practice sessions were held before the race: two 60 minute sessions on Friday and two 45 minute sessions on Saturday. The Friday sessions were held in dry and sunny conditions. Michael Schumacher set the session's fastest time with a lap of 1:15.627, one second ahead of Ralf Schumacher. Giancarlo Fisichella was one-tenth of a second off Ralf Schumacher's pace, with the two Sauber drivers fourth and fifth, Nick Heidfeld ahead of Felipe Massa with Arrows driver Enrique Bernoldi rounding out the top six. The session was disrupted by an incident as Räikkönen stalled after spinning off at the Descida do Sol corner—the incident required a suspension as marshals cleared the track of the car. In the second practice session, David Coulthard set the fastest lap of the day, a 1:15.075. The two Williams drivers were second and fourth, Montoya ahead of Ralf Schumacher; they were separated by Toyota driver Allan McNish. Michael Schumacher and Räikkönen completed the top six positions.

The Saturday practice sessions were again held in dry and sunny conditions. Michael Schumacher again set the fastest lap with a time of 1:13.837. Räikkönen was the second fastest driver, edging closer to Michael Schumacher's time during the session. Barrichello was third fastest, with the Williams drivers fourth and sixth, Ralf Schumacher ahead of Montoya; they were separated by Coulthard. In the final practice session, Ralf Schumacher set the fastest time of the session, a 1:13.543, two hundredths of a second ahead of Coulthard. The Renault drivers were running quicker, Jenson Button ahead of Jarno Trulli. Michael Schumacher and Räikkönen rounded out the top six. The session was disrupted by incidents as Massa's car broke down—the stranded car required a suspension as marshals need to clear the track— and Takuma Sato spun off and struck the safety barriers at turn 7 and lost his car's front wing. After the session's conclusion, the Fédération Internationale de l'Automobile (FIA) announced that Barrichello would have his fastest qualifying time stripped when it was determined that the Ferrari driver left the pitlane when closed. Sato was later given the same punishment for a similar offence.

Qualifying
Saturday's afternoon qualifying session lasted for an hour. During this session, the 107% rule was in effect, which necessitated each driver set a time within 107% of the quickest lap to qualify for the race. Each driver was limited to twelve laps. Montoya achieved his first pole position of the season, his first at Interlagos, with a time of 1:13.114. He was joined on the front row by Michael Schumacher who was one-tenth of a second behind. Ralf Schumacher qualified third, having battled with Montoya for pole position early in the session and was also happy with the set-up of his car. Coulthard qualified fourth, though he was unhappy with his qualifying pace. Coulthard's teammate Räikkönen qualified fifth having been forced to use his team's spare car when his race car developed a hydraulic problem. Trulli, Button, Barrichello, Heidfeld and Mika Salo rounded out the top ten. Pedro de la Rosa bettered teammate Irvine when he qualified 11th; Felipe Massa split the two Jaguar drivers in 12th. Fisichella qualified 14th, with the only Canadian driver in the field, Jacques Villeneuve, managed 15th ahead of his BAR teammate Olivier Panis in 17th; they were separated by McNish in 16th. The Arrows and Minardi drivers qualified at the back of the field, covering positions 18 to 22 with Sato.

Qualifying classification

– The best times of Barrichello (1:13.919) and Sato (1:15.283) were canceled.

Race
The drivers took to the track at 09:30 (UTC -3) for a 30-minute warm-up session. Michael Schumacher maintained his good form over the weekend by setting the fastest time of the session, a 1:15.866, half a second faster than de la Rosa, in second place. Räikkönen had the third fastest time, ahead of the Williams drivers in fourth and fifth—Ralf Schumacher ahead of Montoya—with Barrichello rounding out the top six. A crash by Bernoldi with two minutes of the session remaining caused his car to catch fire and required a red flag as the medical car was deployed to the scene. As medical car driver Alex Ribeiro stopped to assist Bernoldi, Heidfeld lost control and slid off the track, colliding with the car's left door just after Ribeiro opened it.

The race started at 14:00 local time. Michael Schumacher made a good start, drawing alongside Montoya into the first corner. Montoya held the outside line for the turn, but Michael Schumacher overtook around the inside when Montoya ran wide. As the leading pair headed into the first straight, Montoya was in the slipstream off Michael Schumacher's car and braked later than the Ferrari driver which resulted in Montoya losing his front wing.

On lap 7, Fisichella's car suffered an engine failure and became the first retirement of the race.

Schumacher managed to narrowly win ahead of Ralf, but an unusual incident happened at the end of the race, when retired soccer star Pelé, who was tasked with waving the checkered flag, failed to notice the Schumachers approaching the line. He immediately waved by the time he realized his mistake, but did it on the Jordan of Takuma Sato, who was running two laps down on ninth and third-place finisher Coulthard.

Post-race
The top three drivers appeared on the podium to collect their trophies, and in the subsequent press conference.

The race result left Michael Schumacher extending his lead in the Drivers' Championship with 24 points. Ralf Schumacher was second with 16 points, two points ahead of Montoya and ten ahead of Button. In the Constructors' Championship, Ferrari reduced the lead of Williams to six points, and McLaren remained third on eight points with fourteen races of the season remaining.

Race classification

Championship standings after the race 

Drivers' Championship standings

Constructors' Championship standings

Note: Only the top five positions are included for both sets of standings.

References

Brazilian Grand Prix
Brazilian Grand Prix
Grand Prix
Brazilian Grand Prix